Ace Records Ltd. is a British record label founded in 1978. Initially the company only gained permission from the similarly named label based in Mississippi to use the name in the UK, but eventually also acquired the rights to publish their recordings. When Chiswick Records' pop side was licensed to EMI in 1984, Ace switched to more licensing and reissuing work. In the 1980s it also gained the licensing for Modern Records, and its follow-up company Kent Records, whilst in the 1990s, the company bought the labels including all original master tapes.

Sublabels
The following labels are owned or licensed by Ace Records.
Ace Records: initially the only label (reissues, also including Ace Records (US)): Rock 'n' Roll, Rockabilly, Rhythm & Blues, Cajun, 1950s and 1960s Pop, etc. It is well known for several series of releases: "The Golden Age of American Rock 'N' Roll"; "Early Girls"; "Teen Beat" (showcasing instrumentals); and "Radio Gold".
Beat Goes Public: Rare and Classic Funk
Big Beat: 1960s Rock 'n' Roll and Pop
Globe Style: World Music
Kent Records: Motown, Northern Soul, Deep Soul
Kicking Mule: Guitar Music (Stefan Grossman, Bob Brozman, Bert Jansch)
Southbound Records: 1970s Soul and Funk (Millie Jackson, Fatback, Sylvester, Joe Simon)
Westbound Records: Funk, Soul (Funkadelic, Ohio Players, Detroit Emeralds)

Artists released by Ace Records

Albert Washington
Alex Chilton
Arthur Alexander
B.B. King
Bernard Purdie
Big Joe Louis & His Blues Kings
Big Mama Thornton
Big Town Playboys
Bob Lind
Bobby Freeman
Booker T & The MGs
Brenda Lee
Brother Jack McDuff
Buddy Guy
Buffy Sainte-Marie
Caesar Frazier
Candi Staton
Chet Baker
Chuck Higgins
Chuck Jackson
Country Joe & The Fish
Country Joe McDonald
Dan Penn
Dana Gillespie
Darondo
Darrow Fletcher
Dean Friedman
Detroit Emeralds
Dion DiMucci
Doc Watson
Don Julian & The Larks
Donna Hightower (via RPM)
Doris Duke
Dyke and the Blazers
Eddie Cochran
Eric Andersen
Etta James
Fantastic Four
Fatback Band
Fats Domino
Flora Purim
Freddy King
Funk Inc
Funkadelic
Goldie and the Gingerbreads
Hadda Brooks
Hop Wilson
Ian & Sylvia
Ian Tyson
Idris Muhammad
Ike Turner
Irma Thomas
Isaac Hayes
Ivan "Boogaloo Joe" Jones
Ivory Joe Hunter
Jackie Day
Jackie DeShannon
Jackie Lee
George Jackson
James Carr
Jeanette
Jean Jacques Perrey
Jerry Cole
Jerry Jeff Walker
Jerry Lee Lewis
Jesse Belvin
Jimmy Gilmer
Jimmy Hughes
Jimmy Lewis
Jimmy Rushing
Jimmy Witherspoon
Joan Baez
Joe Houston
Joe Simon
Joe Tex
John Fahey
John P. Hammond
John Lee Hooker
Johnnie Taylor
Johnny "Guitar" Watson
Johnny Moped
Johnny Otis
Johnny Tillotson
Junior Wells
King Curtis
Larry Coryell
Larry Williams
Lazy Lester
Lee Hazlewood
Liam Clancy
Lightnin' Hopkins
Lightnin' Slim
Link Wray
Little Milton
Little Richard
Little Willie John
Little Willie Littlefield
Lonnie Mack
Lou Johnson
Lowell Fulson
Luther Ingram
Makin' Time
Maxine Brown
Mel Powell
Melvin Sparks
Mike Bloomfield
Millie Jackson
Richard Fariña
Mississippi John Hurt
Mother Earth
Motörhead
Odetta
Oregon
Otis Redding
Pee Wee Crayton
Phil Ochs
Pleasure
Pucho & The Latin Soul Brothers
Radio Stars
Ramblin' Jack Elliott
Reparata and the Delrons
Richard Berry
Ricky Nelson
Robbie Basho
Rocky Sharpe and the Replays
Rory Brown
Roy Hawkins
Rufus Thomas
S.O.U.L.
Sam Cooke
The Soul Stirrers
Sam Dees
Sandy Nelson
Screaming Lord Sutch
Side Effect
Skip James
Slim Harpo
Smokey Hogg
Sniff 'n' the Tears
Sonny Phillips
Spencer Wiggins
Dusty Springfield
Sylvester
Takeshi Terauchi
Terry Callier
The "5" Royales
The Belmonts
The Bishops
The Blackbyrds
The Champs
The Chocolate Watchband
The Chordettes
The Count Bishops
The Country Gentlemen
The Counts
The Cramps
The Damned
The Delfonics
The Everly Brothers
The Fatback Band
The Fireballs
The Fugs
The Ikettes
The Impressions
The James Taylor Quartet
The Mad Lads
The Manhattans
The Meteors
The Milkshakes
The Newbeats
The Ohio Players
The Ovations
The Pazant Brothers
The Platters
The Prisoners
The Radiators from Space
The Rationals
The Roommates
The Rumblers
The Seeds
The Shirelles
The Solarflares
The Sonics
The Soul Children
The Standells
The Stanley Brothers
The Staple Singers
The String-A-Longs
The Textones 
The Two Things in One
The Ventures
The Wailers
The Weavers
The Wheels
The Zombies
Tom Paxton
U.S. Music With Funkadelic
Walter Jackson
Wanda Jackson
Whirlwind
William Bell
Willie Egan
Willy DeVille
Wynonie Harris

See also
Lists of record labels
World music

References

External links
 

British record labels
Reissue record labels
Record labels established in 1978
IFPI members